Malloreddus, sometimes Italianized as gnocchetti sardi, are a type of pasta typical of Sardinian cuisine. They are usually eaten with different sauces

Malloreddus are typical of the area of Medio Campidano (Province of South Sardinia), but correspond to equivalent types of pasta, made with similar techniques, but in smaller sizes, in other parts of Sardinia and also known as "macarrones de punzu", cigiones, macarones caidos, cravaos.

Cassulli from Carloforte (of Ligurian origin) can be reminiscent of malloreddus. Cassulli, in Sardinia, are found in the archipelago of Sulcis.

Etymology 
The term malloreddu (plural malloreddus) could derive from the Latin mallolus, which means "trunk of dough", dumpling. A second possible etymology would make the name derive from a diminutive of the word malloru, which in Sardinian campidanese (southern and central-southern Sardinia) means bull. Consequently, malloreddus means little calves.

History 
Malloreddus have always been the most prepared traditional dish in Sardinia in all the most important occasions, both in festivals and village fairs, and during weddings. Since ancient times housewives have prepared this type of pasta. The origin is to be found in the millenary scheme of the peasant cultivation-alimentation in the Mediterranean area, mainly based on the cultivation of wheat.

Then the shape was obtained by pressing the cubes of dough against the end of a straw basket, called su ciuliri (the sieve) in order to get them striped, or to have them smooth it was enough to simply press them against a wooden base. The result was a pot-bellied product that in the imagination of the agro-pastoral world took the form of small calves.

Dishes with malloreddus 
The classic dish of Sardinian cuisine is malloreddus alla campidanese. In this dish, a ragú is made by cutting Sardinian sausage into small pieces; the pieces are fried in oil with chopped onion, then boiled for about an hour with tomato sauce; a few strands of saffron are then added, ten minutes before the end of cooking. The boiled gnocchetti are seasoned with this sauce and grated Sardinian pecorino cheese. Originally saffron was used directly in the dough of malloreddus, now instead it is added at the end together with the sauce.

References

Other projects 
  Il Libro di cucina di Wikibooks contiene ricette relative a questo argomento

External links 

 
 

Cuisine of Sardinia
Pasta dishes
Italian cuisine